Douglas Allen Woody (October 3, 1955 – August 26, 2000) was an American bass guitarist best known for his eight-year tenure in the Allman Brothers Band and as a co-founder of Gov't Mule.

Biography
After having studied at Vanderbilt's Blair School of Music, Woody joined the Allman Brothers Band along with guitarist Warren Haynes upon the group's reunion in 1989. Woody and Haynes formed side project Gov't Mule in 1994 with former Dickey Betts drummer Matt Abts. Haynes and Woody decided to leave the Allman Brothers Band in 1997 to put a full-time effort into Gov't Mule. Prior to that, Woody played in the 1970s jazz fusion rock band Montage, and following that with former Kiss drummer Peter Criss in the Criss Penridge Alliance in the 1980s.

Death and legacy
Woody was found dead the morning of Saturday August 26, 2000 at the Marriott Courtyard in Queens, New York. A preliminary autopsy performed was inconclusive and showed no immediate cause of death; but he was subsequently determined to have died of a heroin overdose. He was survived by his wife Jenny and daughter Savannah.

Woody's death helped Haynes in his decision to return to the Allman Brothers Band. Gov't Mule continued on after Woody's death with Andy Hess assuming bass duties after a three-year period that saw a rotating group of bass players including Mike Gordon, Dave Schools, Oteil Burbridge (Woody's replacement in the Allman Brothers Band), George Porter Jr. and Les Claypool.

The Canadian band Big Sugar wrote one song "Nashville Grass" about Woody's death and funeral.

Musical equipment

Woody had a large collection of bass guitars (around 450), featured in his own bass instruction video and was held in high esteem for his playing. The Epiphone Rumble Kat signature bass was similar to two specially built double-neck instruments that Gibson made for him: a bass/guitar and a bass/mandolin. With the Allman Brothers, although Woody used many different basses, Gibson Thunderbirds were his preferred instruments, along with Alembic basses. With Gov't Mule, Allen usually played the Gibson EB series, particularly the hollow-bodied EB-2 and the solid-bodied EB-3. At times he played a Rickenbacker or Gibson Thunderbird. Ampeg SVT was his amp of choice most of the time. Epiphone posthumously released an Allen Woody Limited Edition Bass, a semi-hollow arch-top similar to the Rumble Kat. Woody played esthetically customized Musicvox 4 string Spaceranger and Space Cadet Basses with Gov’t Mule. He played a Musicvox Space Cadet 12 String guitar and Yellow Musicvox Space Cadet 12 String Bass on tour with Blue Floyd performing extended 12 string bass solos in his role as second guitarist in the band.

The movie Rising Low, directed by fellow bass player Mike Gordon, is a documentary about bass players dedicated to the memory of Allen Woody and features bass players that he respected and knew in his lifetime.

Discography
With the Allman Brothers Band
 Seven Turns (1990)
 Shades of Two Worlds (1991)
 Live at Great Woods (1991 VHS/LaserDisc Release, 2014 DVD Release)
 An Evening with the Allman Brothers Band: First Set (1992)
 Where It All Begins (1994)
 An Evening with the Allman Brothers Band: 2nd Set (1995)
 Play All Night: Live at the Beacon Theatre 1992 (2014)

With Gov't Mule
 Gov't Mule (1995)
 Live at Roseland Ballroom (1996)
 Dose (1998)
 Live... With a Little Help from Our Friends (1998)
 Life Before Insanity (2000)
 The Deep End, Volume 1 (2001)
 Mulennium (2010)
 Sco-Mule (feat. John Scofield) (2015) - recorded live in Atlanta in 1999
 The Tel-Star Sessions (2016) - remixed/remastered demo recordings made in June 1994

References

External links
Official Allman Brothers Band website
Official Gov't Mule website
Fly Guitar website featuring an interview with friend and bandmate Warren Haynes; Allen's bass technique, guitar collection and their original ideas when creating Gov't Mule
Rising Low
Allen Woody tribute site
Allen Woody Find-A-Grave

1955 births
2000 deaths
The Allman Brothers Band members
American rock bass guitarists
American male bass guitarists
Gov't Mule members
American mandolinists
Epic Records artists
20th-century American musicians
Guitarists from Tennessee
American male guitarists
20th-century American guitarists
20th-century bass guitarists
Deaths by heroin overdose in New York (state)
Drug-related deaths in New York City
20th-century American male musicians